The Vuelta a Guatemala (Spanish for Tour of Guatemala) is a multi-day road bicycle racing stage race held annually and typically during late October and early November in several locations in Guatemala. The competition carries a UCI rating of 2.2 (having also been rated 2.5 from 2002 to 2004) and is part of the UCI America Tour, which is one of six UCI Continental Circuits sponsored by the Union Cycliste Internationale, the sport's international governing body. The race is organized by the Federacion Nacional de Ciclismo de Guatemala.

History
The Vuelta a Guatemala, which has become the largest sporting event in the country in terms of spectator affluence, was first held in 1957. The winner of the first edition was local racer Jorge Surqué, and during the first four years, the competition was dominated by Guatemalan and Colombian participants. As of 2007, Colombia is the nation with the most wins all-time, with 21 general classification individual wins.

From 1992 to 1996, five different Colombian participants took five consecutive titles, before local racer Luis Rodolfo Muj won in 1997, becoming the first Guatemalan to finish first since Edin Roberto Nova had won his second tour in 1988, and ending the longest drought of titles for his country.

The winner of the 2004 edition of the race, Lizandro Ajcú, was disqualified afterwards for doping in what was the biggest doping case of the race's history – nine riders including the first four on the General classification returned positive A samples.

In 2005, the tour was cancelled after Tropical Storm Stan's heavy rainfalls caused  floods and mudslides which damaged infrastructure and caused 1500 deaths weeks before the race was due to begin.

The LII edition of the race in 2011 was cancelled by the organizers shortly before the start of the race. Heavy rains during September and October damaged roads and paths, and the Guatemala Government, having concerns for life safety, decreed the cancellation as the infrastructure could not be restored in such a short period and rescheduling of the event was not feasible due to the busy schedules of different participants. The event was then scheduled for May 13–20, 2012.

Past winners

References

External links
Website of Federación de Ciclismo de Guatemala – organisers of Vuelta a Guatemala

 
Cycle races in Guatemala
UCI America Tour races
Recurring sporting events established in 1957
1957 establishments in Guatemala